Assoumani may refer to:

 Arnaud Assoumani (born 1985), French athlete
 Azali Assoumani (born 1959), president of the Comoros
 Mansour Assoumani (born 1983), French footballer